Burnaby Public Library or BPL is a public library that serves Burnaby, British Columbia and the surrounding Lower Mainland. According to its 2019-2022 strategic plan, BPL aims to "empower the community to engage with and share stories, ideas and information." BPL provides access to information services and library collections (including books, DVDs, newspapers, magazines and research materials) through its four branches as well as online and through community outreach.

Services
BPL provides a broad range of services and programs that reflect the needs of its community. The following list is a small sample of the regular services available:

Information and reference services
Access to full text databases
Community information
Internet access
Readers' advisory services
Storytimes for babies, toddlers and preschoolers
Programs for children, youth, adults and seniors
Newcomer services including English as an additional language supports
Delivery to homebound individuals
Interlibrary loan
Free downloadable audiobooks
Movie nights
"Book bike" mobile library outreach
Philosophers' Cafe series, in partnership with Simon Fraser University

History
Burnaby's first library was founded in 1927 as the North Burnaby Library Association with members paying one dollar to use a collection of 397 books. The first actual library building was established on East Hastings Street in 1935.

In 1954, a municipal bylaw was enacted to officially establish the Burnaby Public Library. After merging with the North Burnaby Library Association in 1957, BPL's first permanent library building, the McGill Branch, was built in North Burnaby in 1961. The branch was named after Grace McGill, a volunteer with the North Burnaby Library Association since its 1927 inception.

The Kingsway branch was established in 1962 followed by the Central Park branch in 1974 and the Cameron branch in 1980.

In 1991, the Central Park branch was replaced by the Bob Prittie Metrotown branch, BPL's current central branch. The branch is named in honour of former Burnaby teacher, MP, alderman, mayor and library board member Robert "Bob" Prittie.

In 2001, the current 27,000 square-foot McGill branch was completed.

In 2009, the Kingsway branch was closed and replaced with the Tommy Douglas branch. The branch is named after Canadian politician Tommy Douglas, who served as the Member of the House of Commons of Canada for the now-defunct Burnaby—Coquitlam district from 1962 to 1968.

Branches

The library has four branches:
Bob Prittie Metrotown - : As of 2012, this 61,000 square foot branch holds 383,771 items and serves as BPL's main research library with a reference collection that includes local and provincial historical materials, legal and business information, car repair manuals The branch features 21 public internet stations and three stations for accessing the library's database collection.
 McGill - : This 20,000 square foot branch holds 159,704 items as of 2012, and features 16 public internet stations and three stations dedicated to accessing BPL's database collection. The City of Burnaby Archives, Burnaby's official repository for municipal records dating back to 1892, occupies a 4,000-square-foot space adjacent to the McGill branch. 
 Tommy Douglas - : The Tommy Douglas branch is 17,500 square feet and holds 84,568 items as of 2012. Opened on November 21, 2009, this building replaces the old Kingsway branch. The branch features 34 public internet stations, which includes six children's terminals. This branch is also home to Bibliotech, BPL's creative technology lab which loans digital cameras, camcorders and tripods and provides access to computers with Photoshop, iMovie, Garageband and other creative digital software. 
 Cameron - : As of 2012 this 5,000 square foot library holds 62,941 items and provides public internet and computer access via eight computer terminals. The branch was renovated in 2016.

References

External links
Official site

Public libraries in British Columbia
Buildings and structures in Burnaby
Libraries established in 1954
1954 establishments in British Columbia
Tourist attractions in Burnaby